Sándor Gál (13 December 1855 – 4 September 1937) was a Hungarian lawyer and politician, who served as Speaker of the House of Representatives between 1909 and 1910.

References

External links
 Jónás, Károly - Villám, Judit: A Magyar Országgyűlés elnökei 1848-2002. Argumentum, Budapest, 2002. pp. 153–154

1855 births
1937 deaths
People from Harghita County
19th-century Hungarian lawyers
Speakers of the House of Representatives of Hungary